Actoxumab is a human monoclonal antibody designed for the prevention of recurrence of Clostridium difficile infection.

This drug, along with bezlotoxumab, was developed through Phase II efficacy trials by a partnership between Medarex Inc and MassBiologics of the University of Massachusetts Medical School. The project was then licensed to Merck & Co., Inc. for further development and commercialization.

A study compared it with bezlotoxumab (that targets CD toxin-B) and found Actoxumab less effective.

References 

Monoclonal antibodies
Experimental drugs